Hawaiianization refers to the taking of a physical product, word, or concept hitherto unrelated to Hawaiian culture, and confer a Hawaiian form, quality, and character upon it through various means. The word and its conjugated forms are an increasingly popular neologism, in the manner of Anglicisation, Africanization, and Americanization, and is most commonly used in matters of etymology and nomenclature. Consequently, it is used both to mean the transliteration of English into Hawaiian and also the general 'Hawaiianization' of anything. "Hawaiianization"  also means to incorporate the Hawaiian culture, spirit and character to anything and to live the Aloha Spirit through life, love and laughter. It is also used to indicate the adding of Hawaiian instrumentation and/or language to a non-Hawaiian song; the adding of Hawaiian themes such as palm trees, tropical flowers, rainbows, dolphins, whales, sea turtles, volcanic lava flows, etc. to textiles and artifacts: the adding of papaya, mango and/or guava flavors to drinks and edibles; the adding of Hawaiian tropical flower fragrances such as ginger, plumeria, gardenia and tuberose to lotions and beauty products; the use of Hawaiian ideas in gardening. The word has started entering forms of popular culture and is frequently used as an adjective in its gerundive form, "Hawaiianized".

Transliteration into Hawaiian
Hawaiianization can also refer to transliterating words in other languages like English into Hawaiian.  One process for doing so is the following:

 Replace B, F, and P with P.
 Replace C, D, G, J, K, Q, S, T, X, and Z with K.
 Replace L and R with L.
 Replace V and W with W.
 Replace Y with I.
 Separate any consonant clusters with a vowel, usually A.
 If the last letter is a consonant, add a vowel, usually A.
 Vowels remain the same.

Examples:
 Brazil → Palakila
 Gibraltar → Kipalaleka

References

Hawaii culture
Hawaiian language
Cultural assimilation